Katič  may refer to:

Katič, an islet on the Adriatic Sea, in Montenegrin municipality of Budva
Andreja Katič, Slovenian politician

See also
Katić